David Cromer (born October 17, 1964) is an American theatre director, and stage, film, and TV actor.  He has received recognition for his work on Broadway, Off-Broadway, and in his native Chicago. Cromer has won or been nominated for numerous awards, including winning the Lucille Lortel Award and Obie Award for his direction of Our Town. He was nominated for the Drama Desk Award and the Outer Critics Circle Award for his direction of The Adding Machine. In 2018, Cromer won the Tony Award for Best Direction of a Musical for The Band's Visit.

Biography and Education
Born the third of four sons to Richard and Louise Cromer, he was raised in Skokie, Illinois. Cromer dropped out of high school in his junior year, later acquired a GED, and attended Columbia College Chicago.

Career
Cromer has been nominated for or won the Joseph Jefferson Award for his work in Chicago productions, winning for Angels in America Parts I and II in 1998, The Price in 2002, and The Cider House Rules in 2003. In 2005, Cromer made his Off-Broadway debut directing Austin Pendleton's Orson's Shadow at the Barrow Street Theatre. The production originated at the Steppenwolf Theatre Company in Chicago. His 2008 production of a musical adaptation of The Adding Machine also moved to Off-Broadway from Chicago and received wide critical acclaim, receiving six Lucille Lortel Award nominations in the 2008 season, more than any other show. Cromer received a nomination for the 2008 Drama Desk Award, Outstanding Director of a Musical, for The Adding Machine. It is now being produced in regional theaters around the country.

In 2009, Cromer performed the role of the Stage Manager in an Off-Broadway revival of Our Town, which he also directed, at The Barrow Street Theatre. The production, which began in Chicago in 2008, has been acclaimed for its non-traditional elements. Cromer won the Lucille Lortel Award for Outstanding Director and the Obie Award, Directing for Our Town. In the wake of his Our Town success, The New York Times profiled Cromer, referring to "his suddenly thriving career [which] has etched him as a visionary wunderkind, a genius in a black cape with secrets up his billowing sleeves."

In October 2009, Cromer directed a short-lived Broadway revival of Brighton Beach Memoirs starring Noah Robbins, Santino Fontana, Laurie Metcalf, and Dennis Boutsikaris. (The planned production of Broadway Bound was cancelled.) He directed the Broadway revival of The House of Blue Leaves, which starred Ben Stiller and Edie Falco and played a limited run from April 2011 to August 2011.

In 2010, he was announced to direct the Broadway production of the musical Yank! by Joseph and David Zellnik. In 2010, he said of Yank!, "I'm hungrier to work on this than anything in recent memory." However, the production has been postponed, according to The New York Times article of September 2010.

In June to July 2011, he directed A Streetcar Named Desire, with Jessica Hecht as Blanche, at the Williamstown Theater Festival.

He was announced to direct a Broadway revival of Tennessee Williams' Sweet Bird of Youth starring Nicole Kidman and James Franco and set for Fall 2011, but in August 2011 the production was delayed and Franco dropped out. Cromer says it is "still on the drawing board."

He directed Tribes by Nina Raine at the Off-Broadway Barrow Street Theatre, which ran from February 2012 to September 2012.

In October to December 2013, he returned to Chicago to star as Ned Weeks in TimeLine Theatre Company's production of The Normal Heart by Larry Kramer.

In 2016 he directed The Effect and The Band’s Visit, the latter of which winning him the 2017 Obie Award for Directing. In 2017, The Band's Visit transferred to Broadway, where it won 10 Tony Awards, including Best Musical and Best Direction of a Musical.

In 2017 he directed The Treasurer at Playwrights' Horizons.

In 2019, he directed The Sound Inside at Studio 54 for which Cromer received a nomination for the Tony Award for Best Direction of a Play, one of the six Tony nominations the production received.

He also has worked as a character actor. In 2012, he appeared in a small role in the pilot of the television show The Newsroom. In 2015, he played a character in eight episodes of the show Billions.

In 2022 he will direct Camp Siegfried at the Tony Kiser Theatre Off-Broadway.

Personal life

He was named a 2010 MacArthur Fellow, the foundation cited his efforts in reviving classic theater such as his work on The Adding Machine and Our Town in their announcement.

He taught directing at Columbia College Chicago, the same school he attended years prior.

Cromer is gay.

References

External links
 
 

American theatre directors
American male stage actors
American male voice actors
Living people
LGBT theatre directors
LGBT people from Illinois
People from Skokie, Illinois
Columbia College Chicago alumni
MacArthur Fellows
1964 births
American gay actors
Tony Award winners
21st-century LGBT people